Harald Sigfrid Alexander Julin (27 March 1890 – 31 July 1967) was a Swedish swimmer and water polo player who competed at the 1906, 1908, 1912 and 1920 Olympics. In 100 m freestyle  swimming he won a bronze medal in 1908, and failed to reach the finals in 1906 and 1912; he finished fifth in the 4×250 m freestyle relay in 1906. In water polo he won bronze medals in 1908 and 1920 and a silver at the 1912 Summer Olympics in his native Stockholm. His sons Åke and Rolf also became Olympic water polo players.

Julle came from a rich family. Besides water sports he was a fan of motor racing, working as a secretary of the Royal Automobile Club and helping organize several racing events. He later joined the national sports federation.

See also
 Sweden men's Olympic water polo team records and statistics
 List of Olympic medalists in swimming (men)
 List of Olympic medalists in water polo (men)

References

External links
 

1890 births
1967 deaths
Swedish male water polo players
Swedish male freestyle swimmers
Olympic swimmers of Sweden
Olympic water polo players of Sweden
Swimmers at the 1908 Summer Olympics
Swimmers at the 1912 Summer Olympics
Water polo players at the 1908 Summer Olympics
Water polo players at the 1912 Summer Olympics
Water polo players at the 1920 Summer Olympics
Olympic silver medalists for Sweden
Olympic bronze medalists for Sweden
Olympic bronze medalists in swimming
Olympic medalists in water polo
Stockholms KK swimmers
Medalists at the 1920 Summer Olympics
Medalists at the 1912 Summer Olympics
Medalists at the 1908 Summer Olympics
Olympic silver medalists in swimming
Stockholms KK water polo players
Sportspeople from Stockholm